This is a list of films produced in Albania during the 1970s.

Films
  (1970)
  (1970)
  (1970)
  (1970)
  (1970)
  (1970)
  (1971)
  (1971)
  (1971)
  (1971)
  (1972)
  (1972)
  (1972)
  (1972)
  (1972)
  (1973)
  (1973)
  (1973)
  (1973)
  (1974)
  (1974)
  (1974)
  (1974)
  (1974)
  (1974)
  (1975)
  (1975)
  (1975)
  (1975)
  (1975)
  (1975)
  (1975)
  (1976)
  (1976)
  (1976)
  (1976)
  (1976)
  (1976)
  (1976)
  (1976)
  (1976)
  (1976)
  (1977)
  (1977)
  (1977)
  (1977)
  (1977)
  (1977)
  (1977)
  (1977)
  (1977)
  (1977)
  (1978)
  (1978)
  (1978)
  (1978)
  (1978)
  (1978)
  (1978)
  (1978)
  (1978)
  (1978)
  (1979)
  (1979)
  (1979)
  (1979)
  (1979)
  (1979)
  (1979)
  (1979)
  (1979)
  (1979)
  (1979)

References

Lists of Albanian films